5261 Eureka is the first Mars trojan discovered. It was discovered by David H. Levy and Henry Holt at Palomar Observatory on 20 June 1990. It trails Mars (at the ) at a distance varying by only 0.3 AU during each revolution (with a secular trend superimposed, changing the distance from 1.5–1.8 AU around 1850 to 1.3–1.6 AU around 2400). Minimum distances from Earth, Venus, and Jupiter, are 0.5, 0.8, and 3.5 AU, respectively.

Long-term numerical integration shows that the orbit is stable.

At least five other asteroids in near-1:1 resonances with Mars have been discovered, but they do not exhibit trojan behavior. Due to close orbital similarities, most of the other, smaller, members of the L5 group are hypothesized to be fragments of 5261 Eureka that were detached after it was spun up by the YORP effect (consistent with its rotational period of 2.69 h).

The infrared spectrum for 5261 Eureka is typical for an A-type asteroid, but the visual spectrum is consistent with an evolved form of achondrite called an angrite. A-class asteroids are tinted red in hue, with a moderate albedo. The asteroid is located deep within a stable Lagrangian zone of Mars, which is considered indicative of a primordial origin—meaning the asteroid has most likely been in this orbit for much of the history of the Solar System.

Satellite

On 28 November 2011, a natural satellite of 5261 Eureka was found. It has yet to be named, and its provisional designation is S/2011 (5261) 1. The moon is about 0.46 km in diameter and orbits 2.1 km from Eureka. The satellite's existence was announced in September 2014.

See also

References 
 

Further reading
 IAUC 5045
 IAUC 5047
 IAUC 5067
 IAUC 5075
 A. S. Rivkin, R. P. Binzel, S. J. Bus, and J. A. Grier, "Spectroscopy and Classification of Mars Trojan Asteroids", Bulletin of the American Astronomical Society 34, 2002, p. 840.
 S. Tabachnik and N. W. Evans, "Cartography for Martian Trojans", The Astrophysical Journal 517, 1999, pp. L63-L66.

External links 
 The co-orbital asteroids of Mars A simulation and animation showing Mars's co-orbital and near co-orbital asteroids
 Asteroids with Satellites, Robert Johnston, johnstonsarchive.net
 
 

Mars trojans
Eureka
Eureka
Eureka
Binary asteroids
Sr-type asteroids (SMASS)
19900620